Alfred Delucchi (May 27, 1931 - February 26, 2008) was a judge in the Superior Court of Alameda County. Judge Delucchi presided over, among other cases, Scott Peterson's trial as well as Tyrone Robinson's trial for the murder of Huey Newton. Judge Delucchi's record contains only one reversal.

Biography
After graduating from the University of California, Berkeley in Business and Economics, Judge Delucchi graduated from Santa Clara University School of Law. In 1971, he was appointed to the bench by then-Governor Ronald Reagan.

References

American people of Italian descent
California state court judges
Santa Clara University School of Law alumni
University of California, Berkeley alumni
Law in the San Francisco Bay Area
2008 deaths
1931 births
20th-century American judges